R. Bruce Land (born June 24, 1950) is an American Democratic Party politician who represented the 1st Legislative District in the New Jersey General Assembly from 2016 to 2020.

Early life 
Land grew up in Millville, New Jersey and graduated from Millville Senior High School as part of the class of 1968. He was drafted to serve in the United States Army and was assigned to duty with the 101st Airborne Division in Vietnam during the second year of his two-year enlistment from 1969 to 1971, and was twice awarded the Bronze Star during the Vietnam War. Land attended Cumberland County College, where he majored in business marketing. Land had worked in management of a department store in Vineland. He made a career change and began working for the New Jersey Department of Corrections, assigned to Bayside State Prison in Leesburg and South Woods State Prison in Bridgeton until his retirement in March 2008 with the rank of captain.

New Jersey Assembly 
Land ran as a team with Democratic incumbent Assemblyman Bob Andrzejczak, and  won his first bid for elected office, defeating Republican incumbent Sam Fiocchi and his running mate Jim Sauro. Land and Andrzejczak spent four times as much as their opponents and were supported by $1.5 million in independent advertising that claimed that Fiocchi had not paid taxes. In Land’s 2019 re-election campaign he and his running mate Matt Milam lost the election to republicans Erik Simonsen and Antwan McClellan.

Tenure 
Land voted against raising the states minimum wage to $15 an hour alongside Matt Milam.

Committees Assignments 
Homeland Security and State Preparedness 
Military and Veterans' Affairs
Tourism, Gaming and the Arts
Regulated Professions

Electoral history

General Assembly

References

External links
Assemblyman Land's legislative web page, New Jersey Legislature (Archive from December 18, 2019)
New Jersey Legislature financial disclosure forms
2015

1986 births
Living people
Millville Senior High School alumni
Democratic Party members of the New Jersey General Assembly
People from Vineland, New Jersey
Politicians from Cumberland County, New Jersey
21st-century American politicians